Bomberman Party Edition, known in Japan and Europe as simply Bomberman, is a PlayStation version of the 1983 game Bomberman. In addition to vintage graphics for single player mode, an option for enhanced graphics is added. The game was released to the PlayStation Network as a PSone Classic on May 28, 2008, in Japan and December 10, 2009, in North America.

Battle mode is added to this release, which features 8 courses with 3 levels per course.

The single player mode is very similar to the 1985 release of Bomberman. The player controls the titular Bomberman in a wide area, full of destructible and non-destructible blocks. The blocks can be destroyed with bombs, and may contain a power up that increases Bomberman's walking speed, the size of bomb explosions, the number of bombs able to be placed, or the ability to explode your bombs with the push of a button or to walk through walls or bombs.  Some power ups are temporary, allowing Bomberman to be immune to bombs or monsters.

The point of each level is to destroy each monster, and then locate the door, which is located underneath a random block.

After every few levels, the player can play a bonus level.  The player is invincible, and an endless stream of monsters is to be destroyed by the player. The point is to try to build up score until a bonus life is awarded.

Similar in design to Super Bomberman, there are a number of level themes in the single player mode.

External links
The GameSpot review of Bomberman Party Edition
Bomberman Party Edition (YouTube)

1998 video games
Party Edition
PlayStation (console) games
PlayStation Network games
Strategy video games
Multiplayer and single-player video games
Video games developed in Japan
Video games scored by Jun Chikuma
Maze games
Hudson Soft games
Vatical Entertainment games
Virgin Interactive games